Brendan Thomas Beck (born October 6, 1998) is an American professional baseball pitcher for the New York Yankees organization.

Amateur career
Beck attended Corona High School in Corona, California. He played for the team as a pitcher and shortstop. He committed to attend Stanford University in order to play college baseball for the Stanford Cardinal when he was a sophomore.

Beck was eligible to be selected in the 2020 MLB draft following his junior year, but the draft was shortened to five rounds due to the COVID-19 pandemic, and Beck was not selected. He returned to Stanford for his senior year in 2021. He completed his Cardinal career with a 22–10 record, a 3.11 ERA, and 289 strikeouts in  innings pitched.

Professional career
The New York Yankees chose Beck in the second round, with the 55th overall selection, of the 2021 MLB draft. On July 18, 2021, Beck signed with the Yankees for a $1.05 million bonus. In February 2022, it was announced that Beck had undergone Tommy John surgery the previous summer and would miss the entire 2022 season.

Personal life
Beck's mother and older sister are Stanford graduates. Beck and his older brother, Tristan, played baseball together for Corona High and Stanford. Tristan plays professional baseball in the San Francisco Giants organization.

References

External links

1998 births
Living people
Baseball players from California
People from La Jolla, San Diego
Stanford Cardinal baseball players
Baseball pitchers